The 2011 IPP Open was a professional tennis tournament played on hard courts. It was the eleventh edition of the tournament which is part of the 2011 ATP Challenger Tour. It took place in Helsinki, Finland between 21 and 27 November 2011.

ATP entrants

Seeds

 1 Rankings are as of November 14, 2011.

Other entrants
The following players received wildcards into the singles main draw:
  Marko Djokovic
  Harri Heliövaara
  Micke Kontinen
  Herkko Pöllänen

The following players received entry as a special exempt into the singles main draw:
  Frank Dancevic

The following players received entry from the qualifying draw:
  Federico Delbonis
  Mikhail Elgin
  Andrej Martin
  Timo Nieminen

The following players received entry as a lucky loser into the singles main draw:
  Jan-Lennard Struff
  Mischa Zverev

Champions

Singles

 Daniel Brands def.  Matthias Bachinger 7–6(7–2), 7–6(7–5)

Doubles

 Martin Emmrich /  Andreas Siljeström def.  James Cerretani /  Michal Mertiňák, 6–4, 6–4

External links
Official Website
ITF Search 
ATP official site

IPP Open
IPP Open